Tapinoma wilsoni is a species of ant in the genus Tapinoma. Described by Sharaf and Aldawood in 2012, the species is endemic to Saudi Arabia.

References

Tapinoma
Hymenoptera of Asia
Insects described in 2012